,  or  for short, is one of the public universities in Japan. Its campus is located in Nakaragi-cho, Shimogamo, Sakyo-ku, Kyoto.

History 

Saikyo University had at first two faculties: the Faculty of Letters and Domestic Science (in Katsura Campus) / the Faculty of Agriculture (in Shimogamo Campus). The brief history of the university is as follows:
 1951: The Faculty of Women's Junior College was established (in Katsura Campus).
 1959: The University was renamed Kyoto Prefectural University.
 1962: All the faculties were integrated in Shimogamo Campus (Katsura Campus was abolished).
 1970: The Faculty of Letters and Domestic Science was reorganized into two faculties.
 The Graduate School of Agriculture was established (Master's courses).
 1977: The Faculty of Domestic Science was renamed Faculty of Living Science. 
 1983: A Doctoral course was added to the Graduate School of Agriculture.
 1986: The Graduate School of Living Science was established (Master's courses).
 1990: The Graduate School of Letters was established (Master's courses).
 1997: The Faculty of Living Science was reorganized into two faculties: the Faculty of Welfare Society and the Faculty of Human Environment.
 1998: The Faculty of Women's Junior College was abolished.
 2001: Doctoral courses were added to the Graduate School of Letters.
 The Graduate School of Welfare Society was established.
 The Graduate School of Living Science was renamed Graduate School of Human Environment Science (with Doctoral courses).
 2008: The faculties and graduate schools were reorganized.

Undergraduate Schools 
 Faculty of Letters
 Faculty of Welfare Society
 Faculty of Human Environment
 Faculty of Agriculture

The faculties above were reorganized into three new faculties (in April 2008):
 Faculty of Letters
 Faculty of Public Policy
 Faculty of Life and Environmental Sciences

Graduate Schools 
Graduate School of Letters
Graduate School of Welfare Society
Graduate School of Human Environment Science
Graduate School of Agriculture

The graduate schools above were reorganized into three new schools (in April 2008):
 Graduate School of Letters
 Graduate School of Public Policy
 Graduate School of Life and Environmental Sciences

Institutes 
Attached Library
Farm attached to the Faculty of Agriculture

References

External links 
Official Website (Japanese)
English Website

Public universities in Japan
Universities and colleges in Kyoto
Kansai Collegiate American Football League